Elachista clintoni is a moth of the family Elachistidae that is endemic to France.

References

clintoni
Moths described in 1992
Endemic insects of Metropolitan France
Moths of Europe